Reigns is a 2016 strategy game developed by Nerial and published by Devolver Digital. Set in a fictional medieval world, it places the player in the role of a monarch who rules the kingdom by accepting or rejecting suggestions from advisors. The game was released digitally for Android, iOS, Linux, macOS and Microsoft Windows in August 2016.

A sequel, titled Reigns: Her Majesty, in which the player acts as a queen consort, was released in December 2017. Reigns and its sequel were released for Nintendo Switch, under the collective title Reigns: Kings & Queens, in September 2018. A third entry in the Reigns series, Reigns: Game of Thrones, was released in October 2018. A fourth game for Apple Arcade, titled Reigns: Beyond was released in 2020. A fifth game, titled Reigns: Three Kingdoms, was released for Netflix subscribers in November 2022.

Gameplay 

Assuming the role of a medieval king, the player swipes left or right on a card depicting an advisor, in order to accept or reject their suggestion. Each decision will have a consequence, changing the balance between the four pillars of the society: The church, the people, the military, and wealth. The king's reign ends whenever one of the four metric bars becomes full or empty, and the game continues with the player controlling their heir.  Various in-game events can also lead to the king's demise.

Throughout the course of the game, the player may experience different kinds of events, which are scripted or caused by the player's decisions. Such events can have one-time or recurring effects on the game, such as causing the death of the next advisor if their suggestion is rejected.

Development 
The game was developed by London-based game studio Nerial. In an opinion piece published on Polygon, François Alliot, lead developer of the game, commented that the team wanted to "mock the way our societies tend to deal with complexity", citing Brexit as an example. The developers intended to make the player feel the disconnect between the simplicity of the "swipe" control scheme and the consequences their decisions lead to, which inevitably result in the king's demise at the end of each reign.

The interactive soundtrack of the game, titled Songs of Reigns, is available on Steam.

Reception 

According to Metacritic, Reigns has garnered "generally favorable" reviews. Reviewers praised the simplicity of its control scheme, noting its similarity to the "Swipe" interface in social app Tinder. However, Alex Hern from The Guardian found certain choices in the game "nonsensical", and of unclear consequences. TouchArcade praised the scope of the title, saying it did a good job "making a game that’s inherently about simple binary decisions feel like something bigger". Rock Paper Shotgun enjoyed the way the player would change their approach as the game went on, "First time or two around, perhaps like me you'll be an idealist, striving to do whatever's best... My moral conscience eroded steadily over time, as my focus shifted to keeping the plates spinning".

The game won the international competition at the 2017 Ludicious convention. It was nominated for "Best Mobile Game" of Unity Awards 2016, and "Use of Narrative" of Develop Awards 2016.

References

External links 
 

2016 video games
Android (operating system) games
Devolver Digital games
IOS games
Linux games
MacOS games
Nintendo Switch games
Single-player video games
Stadia games
Strategy video games
Video games developed in the United Kingdom
Video games scored by Richard Vreeland
Windows games